Konrad Schaub (born in Edmonton, Alberta) is a Canadian former ice dancer who competed for Canada and Austria. With Allison MacLean, he is the 1995 Karl Schäfer Memorial bronze medalist and a two-time Austrian national champion. They competed in the final segment at four ISU Championships.

Career 
Schaub teamed up with Allison MacLean in 1981. They competed together in ice dancing, working their way up the Canadian categories, from juvenile to senior. Representing Canada, they placed fifth at the 1988 World Junior Championships in Brisbane, Australia. They continued on the junior level the following season, winning bronze at the Merano Autumn Trophy in Merano, Italy, and at the Canadian Championships.

In 1992, MacLean/Schaub moved to Vienna, Austria, and chose Peter Schubl as their coach. MacLean was granted citizenship in 1994, enabling the team to represent Austria internationally. They would win two Austrian national titles and bronze at the 1995 Karl Schäfer Memorial. They qualified to the free dance at three senior-level ISU Championships, finishing 16th at the 1995 European Championships in Dortmund, Germany; 18th at the 1995 World Championships in Birmingham, England; and 18th at the 1996 World Championships in Edmonton, Alberta, Canada.

Upon their retirement from competitive skating, MacLean/Schaub were the world's longest-standing team, having skated together for 15 years.

Competitive highlights 
 With Schaub

References

Navigation

Living people
Canadian male ice dancers
Figure skaters from Edmonton
Year of birth missing (living people)
20th-century Canadian people